Gutturnium muricinum, common name the knobbly triton, is a species of predatory sea snail, a marine gastropod mollusk in the family Cymatiidae.

Description
The maximum recorded shell length is 75 mm.

Habitat 
The minimum recorded depth for this species is 0 m; the maximum recorded depth is 27 m.

Distribution
This marine species occurs in the Indian Ocean off Réunion.

References

 Deshayes, G. P., 1863 Catalogue des mollusques de l‛Ile de la Réunion (Bourbon). In Maillard, L. (Ed.) Notes sur l'Ile de la Réunion (Bourbon), p. 144 p, 14 pls
 Vaught, K.C. (1989). A classification of the living Mollusca. American Malacologists: Melbourne, FL (USA). . XII, 195 pp.
 Richmond, M. (Ed.) (1997). A guide to the seashores of Eastern Africa and the Western Indian Ocean islands. Sida/Department for Research Cooperation, SAREC: Stockholm, Sweden. . 448 pp.

External links
 Malacolog info based on the previous species name
 Röding P.F. (1798). Museum Boltenianum sive Catalogus cimeliorum e tribus regnis naturæ quæ olim collegerat Joa. Fried Bolten, M. D. p. d. per XL. annos proto physicus Hamburgensis. Pars secunda continens Conchylia sive Testacea univalvia, bivalvia & multivalvia. Trapp, Hamburg. viii, 199 pp
 Connolly, M. (1929). Notes on African non-marine Mollusca, with descriptions of many new species. The Annals and Magazine of Natural History, (10) 3 (14): 165-178, pl. 5. London
 Adams, C. B. 1850. Description of supposed new species of marine shells which inhabit Jamaica. Contributions to Conchology, 4: 56-68, 109-123
 Gould, A. A. (1852). Mollusca and shells. In: United States Exploring Expedition during the years 1838, 1839, 1840, 1841, 1842 under the command of Charles Wilkes. Boston. 12: 1-510; atlas 1856: 1-16
 amarck, [J.-B. M.] de. (1822). Histoire naturelle des animaux sans vertèbres. Tome septième. Paris: published by the Author, 711 pp
 Link D.H.F. (1807-1808). Beschreibung der Naturalien-Sammlung der Universität zu Rostock. Rostock: Adlers Erben. 1 Abt. [Part 1], pp. 1–50; 2 Abt. [Part 2], pp. 51–100; 3 Abt. [Part 3], pp. 101–165; Abt. 4 [Part 4],pp. 1–30; Abt. 5 [Part 5], pp. 1–38 [1808]; Abt. 6 [Part 6], pp. 1–38

Cymatiidae
Gastropods described in 1798